Ribeira is the capital of the comarca of Barbanza, in the province of A Coruña in the autonomous community of Galicia in northwestern Spain. The capital and most populous urban center is Santa Uxía de Ribeira. Another of its major points is the center of San Martin de Oleiros. The municipality is administratively divided into nine civil parishes: Aguiño, Artes, Carreira, Castiñeiras, Corrubedo, Oleiros, Olveira, Palmeira and Ribeira.

It is one of the most southerly municipalities of the province. It borders the municipalities of Pobra do Caramiñal and Porto do Son. It has one of the most important inshore fishing ports in the province. Also within the municipality, tuna that is destined for canning is unloaded for manufacturing companies.

It has important administrative services provided to the population that nourishes the municipality, such as the local delegation of the Treasury and three Courts of First Instance and Instruction.

Toponymy
Ribeira is a Galician word, from Latin ripariam, meaning 'bank' or 'shore'. This form was first attested in 1387: Santa Ougea de Ribeira. On the other hand, Uxía, Old Galician Ougia, is the local evolution of the name Eugenia; hence Santa Uxía means Saint Eugenia. The local church of Saint Eugenia is first recorded in a document dated in 1200, as
Sancte Eugenie de Carraria.

History
Traces of the Atlantic megalithic culture in Riberia can be found at the Dolmen de Axeitos and the Pedra das Cabras petroglyph.

Until the 17th century, Ribeira's port was of little importance on the region, partly due to several incursions of vikings, saracens and pirates from the 11th to 18th centuries. Nevertheless, it grew constantly to become one of Galicia's most important fishing ports towards the late 18th century. At that time businessmen of Catalonia arrived in Ribeira and created a successful salting fish industry. King Alfonso XIII granted Ribeira the title of City on 1906

Economy
Economically, Ribeira is very dependent on the sea and it constitutes one of the most important shallow-water fishing ports in Spain. Cultivation of mussels and turbots represents an important source of income. The town also has splendid expectations facing the increase of tourism.

Demographics
The population reaches 28,000 inhabitants, nearly 14,000 residing in Santa Uxía, main urban nucleus and parish.
There is a significant number of people settled abroad, mainly in Newark, New Jersey, Harrison, New Jersey, Carteret, New Jersey, and Lyndhurst, New Jersey.

Tourism
In recent years the tourism industry has set their sights on the Barbanzana capital.

Traces of the past can be cherished by visiting the Dolmen de Axeitos or "The Parthenon of Megalithic" as described by the late official chronicler of the municipality, Carlos Garcia Bayon. The remains of Celtic culture and forts are dotted throughout the Riveira territory along with petroglyphs for cultural tourists seeking a peek into the past.

Tourists seeking recreation in the scenic beauty have a starting point in Ribeira. The natural park of the Dunes and lagoons Carregal Corrubedo and Vixán (Dune Corrubedo) offer visitors, among other peculiarities, 1000 hectares of park and 5 kilometers of coastline. It should be mentioned that the largest moving dune in the northwest peninsular is here that is 1.2 kilometers in length and no less than 15 meters in height.

Another main tourist attraction in Ribeira is 'Festa da Dorna', a major event taking place one week prior to the 24th of July (which is a local holiday and the biggest day of the event). It has been taking place since 1948 and it was declared a Galician Festival of Tourist Interest in 2005. There are several fun activities taking place during the days that it is celebrate. People organize themselves in groups called "peñas", identified by colorful t-shirts and fun names related to the sea life.

Gastronomy
The municipality is located at the mouth of the Ria de Arousa, which boasts of being the most productive shellfish area in Spain. Ribeira is one of the first inshore fishing ports so it can be said that its cuisine is intimately linked to the sea.

Notable people
Ana Peleteiro, athlete
Andrés Torres Queiruga, theologian and writer

References

External links

 Ribeira Council Official Webpage
 Parish of Carreira Official Webpage

Municipalities in the Province of A Coruña